Adriaan Walter Brokke (22 October 1928 – March 2011) was a Curaçaoan footballer. He competed in the men's tournament at the 1952 Summer Olympics.

References

External links
 

1928 births
2011 deaths
Curaçao footballers
Netherlands Antilles international footballers
Olympic footballers of the Netherlands Antilles
Footballers at the 1952 Summer Olympics
Place of birth missing
Association football forwards
SV Racing Club Aruba players